Expedition 8 was the eighth expedition to the International Space Station.

Crew

Planned crew before Columbia disaster

Mission parameters
Perigee: 384 km
Apogee: 396 km
Inclination: 51.6°
Period: 92 min
Docked: 20 October 2003 - 07:15:58 UTC
Undocked: 29 April 2004 - 20:52:09 UTC
Time Docked: 192 days, 13 h, 36 min, 11 s

Mission objectives
Expedition 8 Commander and NASA Station Science Officer Michael Foale, Flight Engineer Alexander Kaleri and ESA Astronaut Pedro Duque docked the Soyuz TMA-3 with the International Space Station at 07:15:58 UTC on 20 October 2003. At the time of docking, both spacecraft orbited the Earth above Russia.

Once the Expedition 7 crew undocked, Foale and Kaleri settled down to work, beginning a more than six-month stint focused on Station operations and maintenance.

The new station crew, along with Duque, launched from the Baikonur Cosmodrome in Kazakhstan at 05:38:03 UTC, on 18 October 2003.

Foale and Kaleri departed the station for earth aboard the Soyuz TMA-3 spacecraft on 29 April 2004 along with ESA Astronaut André Kuipers, who had arrived with the Expedition 9 crew aboard Soyuz TMA-4 nine days earlier.

Spacewalks
The Expedition 8 crew conducted the first two-person spacewalk at the International Space Station. Unlike previous spacewalks conducted by ISS crews, there was not a crewmember inside the Station as the spacewalkers worked outside.  The spacewalk was based out of the Pirs docking compartment; the spacewalkers wore Russian Orlan space suits.

This was the 52nd spacewalk devoted to Space Station assembly, operations and maintenance, bringing the cumulative total to 322 hours and 32 minutes. It was the 27th based out of the Station, bringing the total to 155 hours and 17 minutes.

Images

References

External links

 Expedition 8 Photography

Expedition 08
2003 in spaceflight
2004 in spaceflight